Sanjoy Deb (born December 18, 1991), known primarily by his stage name Sanjoy, is an American musician, electronic music producer and DJ. He primarily produces in the EDM genre and is influenced by Bollywood.

Sanjoy's best-known musical piece is the song "Shangri-La", which has charted on US Top 40 and dance radio. In 2017, he released "OBVI" featuring American Idol singer Elliott Yamin. In 2021, He released "One in a Million" song and music video with Got7's Mark Tuan. In, 2022 He featured in Guru Randhawa's blockbuster album "Man of the Moon" where he produced and wrote 5 songs with Guru Randhawa.

Life and career beginning
Sanjoy Deb was born in Dhaka (Bangladesh) and raised in San Jose, California. He attended Evergreen Valley High School and De Anza College and graduated from San Jose State University with a degree in business. Sanjoy began his musical career working with his partner and executive producer Kunal Agarwal. Sanjoy claims to have strong Indian roots through his grandparents.

Career
Under the name 'Sanjoy', Deb has produced a wide variety of Electro-Pop Music, and previously produced Bollywood film songs.

2011–2014: Bollywood mash-ups, "Ab Laut Aa" 

Sanjoy began his professional music career in 2011 with a series of mash-ups and remixes that were well received in the Indian-American community. The cultural connection between Indian-Americans and Bollywood music had resulted in niche audiences who were very interested in remixed Hindi film music for dance performances and videos. His first mash-up "Chammak Challo" featured dancers from the UC Berkeley dance team, Azaad, and built his core audience of Bollywood-EDM listeners who were connected to the dance team circuit. He later released another video and mash-up called Love the Pressure, which further engaged those of Indian descent worldwide.

His first original music video was called "Tonight I Believe" (2012). The track received much attention across the Internet, but because of the negative response and criticism with the vocals, it was promptly pulled from YouTube. Deb also released an unofficial remix of Swedish House Mafia's "Don't You Worry Child".

In 2013, Sanjoy produced a single for the well-known Indian singer Sunidhi Chauhan. Their collaboration Ab Laut Aa was well-received, especially due to the topic of the music video on the prevalence of gender discrimination and rape in India. He subsequently released a reprise version featuring Gaurav Dagaonkar as the vocalist and songwriter.

2014–2016: T-Series deal, Dance Under the Influence 

The 'Ab Laut Aa' collaboration ultimately propelled Sanjoy through a series of production opportunities with various Hindi film music directors, such as Pritam and Salim–Sulaiman. Some of these projects included Shaadi Ki Side Effects, and Bajrangi Bhaijaan

The label T-Series also signed a multi-single deal with Sanjoy to remix well-known Bollywood songs in his distinct mash-up style. There are two released mash-ups with T-Series, Tum Hi Ho and Gumshuda. Both songs retain the original singers but have been remixed into an electro-pop dance record. Tum Hi Ho draws influences from Swedish House Mafia's Greyhound.

In 2016, Sanjoy began to release a series of English songs, each featuring a Bollywood singer. His track "Don't Funk With Me" with Benny Dayal broke the ice on his English music. His next track released in February, named "Completed Me", featured Aditi Singh Sharma. This compilation resulted in his album, Dance Under the Influence.

The front single for Dance Under the Influence, Slip Away, introduced the American Idol nominee Trevor Holmes as his first collaboration and single. The music video features Sanjoy at one of his live shows in Santa Cruz, California.

2016–2018: Further collaborations, PORT22 distribution through Sony RED 

2017's single Obvi featured the American Idol Elliott Yamin, of  "Wait for You" fame. The track was recorded in an untitled Sherman Oaks studio owned by Russell Ali. Released by PORT22 (Sanjoy and Kunal Agarwal's label), it debuted on Top 40 radio and was one of the biggest movers on Shazam. This was the first release of Sanjoy's to be distributed through Sony RED distribution.

The track gained the attention of the lead singer of the K-Pop group, Got7, Youngjae. Fans of Youngjae connected Sanjoy with the K-Pop and his music through social media. The friendly meeting and instant connection led to the collaboration, Victim of Love, which was recorded in New York while they were both on holiday.

The release of Victim of Love required Sanjoy to break ties with his distributor, Sony.

Sanjoy's last track of 2017, Shangri-La, was his most successful on Top 40 radio. It debuted on Power96 in Miami and ran through several other top market stations, including San Francisco and Las Vegas.

2018-Present: West Coast Customs, Gen-Z music producer, New Releases 

Sanjoy's studio is located in the West Coast Customs, an automobile customization shop made famous by Pimp My Ride. Much of his music is produced at the studio, and he also produces and song-writes for various artists. In particular, his specialty has been producing for social media stars popularized by YouTube, Vine, and Musically/Tik-Tok. These artists include: Jacob Sartorius, Carson Leuders, Christian Delgrosso, and Sofie Dossi.

His latest releases bring a more energetic music with ethnic-focused lyric content. The first of 2019, Mumbae Bounce, featured artwork by Babbu the Painter.

Discography

Albums

Dance Under the Influence

Singles

As lead artist

Production work

Remixes

Music videos

Awards and nominations

References

External links

 Official Website
 Facebook

1991 births
Living people
Indian film score composers
Bangladeshi male musicians
People from San Jose, California
People from Srimangal Upazila
Club DJs
Remixers
American dance musicians
Bangladeshi emigrants to the United States
American DJs
American house musicians
San Jose State University alumni
Electronic dance music DJs
Indian male film score composers